Irina Zaitseva (born ) is a Kazakhstani female volleyball player. She was part of the Kazakhstan women's national volleyball team.

She competed with the national team at the 2008 Summer Olympics in Beijing,  China.   She played with Rahat in 2008.

Clubs
  Rahat (2008)

See also
 Kazakhstan at the 2008 Summer Olympics

References

External links
Irina Zaitseva at Sports Reference
http://www.scoresway.com/70.html?sport=volleyball&page=player&id=365</ref> 
2008 Official Results Part Two: Hockey – Wrestling, LA84 Foundation.

1982 births
Living people
Kazakhstani women's volleyball players
Sportspeople from Tashkent
Volleyball players at the 2008 Summer Olympics
Olympic volleyball players of Kazakhstan
Volleyball players at the 2002 Asian Games
Asian Games competitors for Kazakhstan